Agathiopsis maculata is a moth of the family Geometridae. It is found on New Guinea and Australia (Queensland).

Adults are green, the forewings with a ragged broad brown margin, and a similar stripe across the hindwings, which have a scalloped margin. Males have darker brown stripes than females.

References

Moths described in 1896
Geometrinae
Moths of New Guinea
Moths of Australia